Di Palma (or di Palma) is a surmame. Notable people with this surname include:

 Carlo Di Palma (1925 –2004), Italian cinematographer
 Dario Di Palma (1932-2004), Italian film cinematographer
 José Luis Di Palma (born 1966), Argentine racing driver
 Louis DiPalma (born 1961), American politician
 Luciano Di Palma (born 1944), Italian judoka
 Patricio Di Palma (born 1971), Argentine racing driver
 Rubén Luis di Palma (1944–2000), Argentine racing driver
 Vincenzo Di Palma (born 1970), Italian coxswain

Italian-language surnames